The Continental Basketball Association (CBA)—and its previous incarnations as the Eastern Pennsylvania Basketball League, the Eastern Professional Basketball League (EPBL) and the Eastern Basketball Association (EBA)—was a professional basketball league which lasted 63 seasons from 1946 to 2009.

1978–79 season

Teams
Allentown Jets
Anchorage Northern Knights
Baltimore Metros 
Jersey Shore Bullets
Lancaster Red Roses
Maine Lumberjacks
Mohawk Valley Thunderbirds 
Rochester Zeniths
Wilkes-Barre Barons

Regular season standings

 Mohawk Valley Thunderbirds disbanded midseason

Timeline
July 1978: the CBA board of directors unanimously approved the admittance of the Rochester Zeniths to the league. The Zeniths were previously members of the All-American Basketball Alliance. The EBA announced that the Providence Shooting Stars were folding due to unpaid debts. The league allowed the Long Island Ducks and the Brooklyn Dodgers to attempt to find financial backing.
February 17, 1979: the Anchorage Northern Knights set CBA records for team points in a game with 183 and, points in a single half with 99 in the second half, and field goals in a game with 74.

Postseason

NBA affiliates
Baltimore Metros: Baltimore Bullets, Atlanta Hawks, Milwaukee Bucks

1979–80 season

Teams
Anchorage Northern Knights
Hawaii Volcanos
Lancaster Red Roses
Lehigh Valley Jets
Maine Lumberjacks
Pennsylvania Barons
Rochester Zeniths
Utica Olympics

Regular season standings

Timeline
April 1, 1980: Maine Lumberjacks player Charles Jones had a CBA record 26 rebounds in a game. Maine lost the Eastern Conference Finals game to the Rochester Zeniths, 140–132.
Postseason

1980–81 season

Teams
Alberta Dusters
Anchorage Northern Knights
Atlantic City Hi-Rollers
Billings Volcanos
Lehigh Valley Jets
Maine Lumberjacks
Montana Golden Nuggets
Philadelphia Kings
Rochester Zeniths
Scranton Aces

Regular season standings

Timeline
July to October 1980: After Darryl Dawkins shattered two basketball backboards during his 1979–80 NBA season, the CBA implemented a collapsible hinged rim for the 1980–81 season. The design was chosen from 10 prototypes which were set up in a New York City high school gymnasium in the summer of 1980. Unidentified college basketball players were asked to try to break the rims and the three strongest designs were chosen for a trail run in the CBA. All three rims broke away from the backboard and snapped back in place. The NBA implemented one of the CBA's designs the following season.

1981–82 season

Teams
Alberta Dusters
Anchorage Northern Knights
Billings Volcanos
Lancaster Lightning
Maine Lumberjacks
Montana Golden Nuggets
Rochester Zeniths
Wildwood Hi-Rollers

Regular season standings

NBA affiliates
Billings Volcanos: Chicago Bulls, Phoenix Suns, Utah Jazz

1982–83 season

Teams
Albany Patroons
Albuquerque Silvers 
Billings Volcanos
Detroit Spirits
Lancaster Lightning
Las Vegas Silvers 
Maine Lumberjacks
Montana Golden Nuggets
Ohio Mixers
Rochester Zeniths
Reno Bighorns
Wisconsin Flyers
Wyoming Wildcatters

Regular season standings

Timeline
January 30, 1982: The 1982 CBA All-Star Game at Meadowlands Arena in East Rutherford, New Jersey was the first nationally televised CBA game. It was broadcast on the USA Network.

1983–84 season

Teams
Albany Patroons
Albuquerque Silvers 
Bay State Bombardiers
Detroit Spirits
Lancaster Lightning
Louisville Catbirds
Ohio Mixers
Puerto Rico Coquis
Sarasota Stingers
Toronto Tornados
Wisconsin Flyers
Wyoming Wildcatters

Regular season standings

NBA affiliates
Albany Patroons: Denver Nuggets, New York Knicks
Albuquerque Silvers: Los Angeles Lakers, Seattle SuperSonics
Bay State Bombardiers: Boston Celtics, Houston Rockets
Detroit Spirits: Detroit Pistons, Dallas Mavericks
Lancaster Lightning: Cleveland Cavaliers, Philadelphia 76ers
Louisville Catbirds: Washington Bullets, Portland Trail Blazers, Utah Jazz
Ohio Mixers: Atlanta Hawks, San Antonio Spurs
Puerto Rico Coquis: New Jersey Nets, Portland Trail Blazers
Sarasota Stingers: Kansas City Kings, Utah Jazz
Toronto Tornados: Chicago Bulls, Golden State Warriors
Wisconsin Flyers: Indiana Pacers, Milwaukee Bucks
Wyoming Wildcatters: Phoenix Suns, San Diego Clippers

1984–85 season

Teams
Albany Patroons
Albuquerque Silvers 
Bay State Bombardiers
Cincinnati Slammers
Detroit Spirits
Evansville Thunder
Lancaster Lightning
Louisville Catbirds
Puerto Rico Coquis
Sarasota Stingers
Tampa Bay Thrillers
Toronto Tornados
Wisconsin Flyers
Wyoming Wildcatters

Regular season standings

Timeline
February 1984: To keep travel costs down, the CBA barred teams from bringing their assistant coach(s) on road trips. The Albany Patroons were fined $1,200 after assistant coach Charley Rosen accompanied the team on a road trip to Puerto Rico. The Partoons later skirted the rule by classifying Rosen as a trainer, as teams were permitted to have a trainer travel with them.
May 21, 1984: During the annual board of directors meeting CBA commissioner Jim Drucker announced plans for expansion to at least 13 cities. Drucker also unveiled his plans for "CBA East", a developmental league for the CBA which would be the third-tier men's professional basketball league in the United States behind the CBA and the NBA, respectively. Possible sites for the CBA East franchises were Columbia, Maryland; Trenton, New Jersey; Springfield, Massachusetts; Syracuse, New York; Scranton, Pennsylvania; Allentown, Pennsylvania; Wilkes-Barre, Pennsylvania; Wilmington, Delaware; and Long Island, New York. Drucker was quoted by UPI reporter David Nathan, "This year the CBA will take off [...] We're moving into larger markets and I have no doubt the CBA East will exist". Rule changes were adopted which included a change to three point fouls where the shooter would be granted three free throws as opposed to two. A rule similar to the clear path foul was adopted where a foul on a "uncontested breakaway" would result in an automatic two points and possession of the ball. Rosters were decreased from 10 spots to nine. The board of directors approved an expansion franchise in Evansville, Indiana and another in Hartford, Connecticut contingent on the required ticket sales. Changes to the CBA drug policy were described by UPI's David Nathan, "a tough drug policy, much like the NBA's".
May 22, 1984: The CBA board of directors approved the re-location of the Ohio Mixers from Lima, Ohio to Cincinnati, Ohio. Cincinnati's last professional basketball team was the NBA Cincinnati Royals who left the city in 1972 for Kansas City.
September 7, 1984: The CBA announced it had signed a broadcasting agreement with Black Entertainment Television to air 15 games during the 1984–85 season.
October 28, 1984: A game between the Soviet Union men's national basketball team and a team composed of CBA players was held in Albany, New York. The Soviet team was without Arvydas Sabonis who was sidelined with a foot injury. The Soviet team defeated the CBA team by a score of 77–72. Vladimir Tkachenko and Šarūnas Marčiulionis of the Soviet team led all scorers with 18 points a piece. Kenny Natt of the CBA club led his team with 16 points. Other CBA players included Billy Goodwin, Derrick Rowland, Lowes Moore and Cozell McQueen.
February 16, 1985: CBA commissioner Jim Drucker and the league was profiled in a UPI article by Joe Juliano titled "CBA is providing games, gimmicks". Juliano notes that one of Drucker's strategies for promotions are unique like the "Ton of Money CBA Free Throw" in which a randomly selected spectator is given a chance to make two shots from the free throw line for a chance at 5,000 pennies ($5,000). When asked about the gimmicks and promotions Drucker responded, "You can't touch anything at a basketball game [...] so we've got to be able to guarantee our fans 10 memorable moments, five of which are totally detached from the game. We have to guarantee that our fans go home happy." Other promotions included "The 1 Million Dollar CBA Supershot" where a spectator could win $50,000 a year over 20 years if they made a shot from 69 feet and 9 inches away from the basket. The "Fly In, Drive Away" promotion gave spectators a chance to fly a paper airplane into the sunroof of a vehicle for a chance to win its title. During the 1977 season the expansion franchise fee was $5,000 as opposed to the $500,000 fee in 1985. Drucker laid out his plans for further expansion to the UPI telling Juliano there was inquiries from investors in San Diego, California; Fort Wayne, Indiana; Vancouver, British Columbia and Tacoma, Washington. Drucker also announced plans for a league called the "CBA East" which would be a developmental league for the CBA. He said the CBA East would begin during the 1985–86 season.

NBA affiliates
Albany Patroons: New York Knicks, Houston Rockets
Albuquerque Silvers: Cleveland Cavaliers, Utah Jazz
Bay State Bombardiers: Portland Trail Blazers, Boston Celtics
Cincinnati Slammers: Atlanta Hawks, San Antonio Spurs
Detroit Spirits: Detroit Pistons, Boston Celtics
Lancaster Lightning: Philadelphia 76ers, Washington Bullets
Louisville Catbirds: Denver Nuggets, Washington Bullets
Puerto Rico Coquis: New Jersey Nets, Seattle SuperSonics
Sarasota Stingers: Kansas City Kings, San Antonio Spurs
Tampa Bay Thrillers: Indiana Pacers, Los Angeles Clippers
Toronto Tornados: Chicago Bulls, Golden State Warriors
Wisconsin Flyers: Milwaukee Bucks, Houston Rockets
Wyoming Wildcatters: Phoenix Suns, San Diego Clippers

1985–86 season

Teams
Albany Patroons
Baltimore Lightning
Bay State Bombardiers
Cincinnati Slammers
Detroit Spirits
Evansville Thunder
Florida Stingers
Kansas City Sizzlers
La Crosse Catbirds
Maine Windjammers
Pensacola Tornados
Tampa Bay Thrillers
Wisconsin Flyers
Wyoming Wildcatters

Regular season standings

NBA affiliates
Kansas City Sizzlers: San Antonio Spurs, Los Angeles Lakers

1986–87 season

Teams
Albany Patroons
Charleston Gunners
Cincinnati Slammers
Jacksonville Jets  
La Crosse Catbirds
Mississippi Jets  
Pensacola Tornados
Rapid City Thrillers
Rockford Lightning
Savannah Spirits
Topeka Sizzlers
Wisconsin Flyers
Wyoming Wildcatters

Regular season standings

1987–88 season

Teams
Albany Patroons
Charleston Gunners
La Crosse Catbirds
Mississippi Jets 
Pensacola Tornados
Quad City Thunder
Rapid City Thrillers
Rochester Flyers
Rockford Lightning
Savannah Spirits
Topeka Sizzlers
Wyoming Wildcatters

Regular season standings

NBA affiliations 
Albany Patroons: Boston Celtics, New York Knicks
Charleston Gunners: Cleveland Cavaliers, Golden State Warriors
La Crosse Catbirds: Milwaukee Bucks, Washington Bullets
Mississippi Jets: Detroit Pistons, Sacramento Kings
Pensacola Tornados: Los Angeles Clippers, San Antonio Spurs
Quad City Thunder: Houston Rockets, Portland Trail Blazers
Rapid City Thrillers: Indiana Pacers, Washington Bullets
Rochester Flyers: Dallas Mavericks, Denver Nuggets
Rockford Lightning: Chicago Bulls, Phoenix Suns
Savannah Spirits: Atlanta Hawks, New Jersey Nets
Topeka Sizzlers: Los Angeles Lakers, Philadelphia 76ers
Wyoming Wildcatters: Utah Jazz, Seattle SuperSonics

1988–89 season

Teams
Albany Patroons
Cedar Rapids Silver Bullets
Charleston Gunners
La Crosse Catbirds
Pensacola Tornados
Quad City Thunder
Rapid City Thrillers
Rochester Flyers
Rockford Lightning
Topeka Sizzlers
Tulsa Fast Breakers
Wichita Falls Texans

Regular season standings

NBA affiliates
Albany Patroons: New York Knicks, Washington Bullets
Cedar Rapids Silver Bullets: Portland Trail Blazers, Golden State Warriors, Sacramento Kings
Charleston Gunners: Charlotte Hornets, Indiana Pacers
La Crosse Catbirds: Milwaukee Bucks, Atlanta Hawks
Pensacola Tornados: Los Angeles Clippers, Cleveland Cavaliers
Quad City Thunder: Houston Rockets, Seattle SuperSonics
Rapid City Thrillers: Denver Nuggets, Miami Heat, Indiana Pacers
Rochester Flyers: Detroit Pistons, Utah Jazz
Rockford Lightning: Chicago Bulls, Boston Celtics
Topeka Sizzlers: Philadelphia 76ers, Los Angeles Lakers
Tulsa Fast Breakers: New Jersey Nets, San Antonio Spurs
Wichita Falls Texans: Dallas Mavericks, Phoenix Suns

1989–1990 season

Teams
Albany Patroons
Cedar Rapids Silver Bullets
Columbus Horizon
Grand Rapids Hoops
La Crosse Catbirds
Omaha Racers
Pensacola Tornados
Quad City Thunder
Rapid City Thrillers
Rockford Lightning
San Jose Jammers
Santa Barbara Islanders
Sioux Falls Skyforce
Topeka Sizzlers
Tulsa Fast Breakers
Wichita Falls Texans

Regular season standings

NBA affiliates
Albany Patroons: New York Knicks, Portland Trail Blazers
Cedar Rapids Silver Bullets: Indiana Pacers, Utah Jazz
Columbus Horizon: Houston Rockets, Boston Celtics
Grand Rapids Hoops: Detroit Pistons, Phoenix Suns
La Crosse Catbirds: Milwaukee Bucks, Sacramento Kings
Omaha Racers: Cleveland Cavaliers, New Jersey Nets
Pensacola Tornados: Cleveland Cavaliers, New Jersey Nets
Quad City Thunder: Charlotte Hornets, Seattle SuperSonics
Rapid City Thrillers: Miami Heat, Portland Trail Blazers
Rockford Lightning: Chicago Bulls, Seattle SuperSonics
San Jose Jammers: Golden State Warriors, Sacramento Kings
Santa Barbara Islanders: Los Angeles Clippers, Los Angeles Lakers
Sioux Falls Skyforce: Minnesota Timberwolves, Washington Bullets
Topeka Sizzlers: Atlanta Hawks, Philadelphia 76ers
Tulsa Fast Breakers: San Antonio Spurs, New Jersey Nets
Wichita Falls Texans: Dallas Mavericks, Boston Celtics

1990–91 season

Teams
Albany Patroons
Cedar Rapids Silver Bullets
Columbus Horizon
Grand Rapids Hoops
La Crosse Catbirds
Oklahoma City Cavalry
Omaha Racers
Pensacola Tornados
Quad City Thunder
Rapid City Thrillers
Rockford Lightning
San Jose Jammers
Sioux Falls Skyforce
Tulsa Fast Breakers
Wichita Falls Texans
Yakima Sun Kings

Regular season standings

1991–92 season

Teams
Albany Patroons
Bakersfield Jammers 
Birmingham Bandits
Columbus Horizon
Fort Wayne Fury
Grand Rapids Hoops
La Crosse Catbirds
Oklahoma City Cavalry
Omaha Racers
Quad City Thunder
Rapid City Thrillers
Rockford Lightning
Sioux Falls Skyforce
Tri-City Chinook
Tulsa Zone
Wichita Falls Texans
Yakima Sun Kings

Regular season standings

 The Bakersfield Jammers disbanded midseason

NBA affiliates
Albany Patroons: New York Knick, Phoenix Suns (M–Z)
Bakersfield Jammers: Golden State Warriors, Los Angeles Lakers (A–L)
Birmingham Bandits: Atlanta Hawks, San Antonio Spurs (A–L)
Columbus Horizon: Cleveland Cavaliers, Los Angeles Lakers (M–Z)
Fort Wayne Fury: Indiana Pacers, Philadelphia 76ers (M–Z)
Grand Rapids Hoops: Detroit Pistons, Phoenix Suns (A–L)
La Crosse Catbirds: Milwaukee Bucks, Washington Bullets (A–L)
Oklahoma City Cavalry: Boston Celtics, Houston Rockets
Omaha Racers: Sacramento Kings, Utah Jazz (A–L)
Quad City Thunder: Charlotte Hornets, Philadelphia 76ers (A–L)
Rapid City Thrillers: Miami Heat, Los Angeles Clippers (A–L)
Rockford Lightning: Chicago Bulls, Utah Jazz (M–Z)
Sioux Falls Skyforce: Minnesota Timberwolves, Los Angeles Lakers (M–Z)
Tri-City Chinook: Denver Nuggets, Orlando Magic
Tulsa Zone: New Jersey Nets, Washington Bullets (M–Z)
Wichita Falls Texans: Dallas Mavericks, San Antonio Spurs (M–Z)
Yakima Sun Kings: Portland Trail Blazers, Seattle SuperSonics

1992–93 season

Teams
Capital Region Pontiacs
Columbus Horizon
Fargo-Moorhead Fever
Fort Wayne Fury
Grand Rapids Hoops
La Crosse Catbirds
Oklahoma City Cavalry
Omaha Racers
Quad City Thunder
Rapid City Thrillers
Rochester Renegade
Rockford Lightning
Sioux Falls Skyforce
Tri-City Chinook
Wichita Falls Texans
Yakima Sun Kings

Regular season standings

1993–94 season

Teams
Columbus Horizon
Fargo-Moorhead Fever
Fort Wayne Fury
Grand Rapids Hoops
Hartford Hellcats
La Crosse Catbirds
Oklahoma City Cavalry
Omaha Racers
Quad City Thunder
Rapid City Thrillers
Rochester Renegade
Rockford Lightning
Sioux Falls Skyforce
Tri-City Chinook
Wichita Falls Texans
Yakima Sun Kings

Regular season standings

1994–95 season

Teams
Chicago Rockers
Fort Wayne Fury
Grand Rapids Mackers
Harrisburg Hammerheads 
Mexico City Aztecas
Oklahoma City Cavalry
Omaha Racers
Pittsburgh Piranhas
Quad City Thunder
Rapid City Thrillers
Rockford Lightning
Shreveport Crawdads
Sioux Falls Skyforce
Tri-City Chinook
Yakima Sun Kings

Regular season standings

1995–96 season

Teams
Chicago Rockers
Connecticut Pride
Florida Beachdogs
Fort Wayne Fury
Grand Rapids Mackers
Oklahoma City Cavalry
Omaha Racers
Quad City Thunder
Rockford Lightning
San Diego Wildcards 
Shreveport Storm
Sioux Falls Skyforce
Yakima Sun Kings

Regular season standings

1996–97 season

Teams
Connecticut Pride
Florida Beachdogs
Fort Wayne Fury
Grand Rapids Hoops
La Crosse Bobcats
Oklahoma City Cavalry
Omaha Racers
Quad City Thunder
Rockford Lightning
Sioux Falls Skyforce
Yakima Sun Kings

Regular season standings

1997–98 season

Teams
Connecticut Pride
Fort Wayne Fury
Grand Rapids Hoops
Idaho Stampede
La Crosse Bobcats
Quad City Thunder
Rockford Lightning
Sioux Falls Skyforce
Yakima Sun Kings

Regular season standings

1998–99 season

Teams
Connecticut Pride
Fort Wayne Fury
Grand Rapids Hoops
Idaho Stampede
La Crosse Bobcats
Quad City Thunder
Rockford Lightning
Sioux Falls Skyforce
Yakima Sun Kings

Regular season standings

1999–2000 season

Teams
Connecticut Pride
Fort Wayne Fury
Grand Rapids Hoops
Idaho Stampede
La Crosse Bobcats
Quad City Thunder
Rockford Lightning
Sioux Falls Skyforce
St. Charles Hawks 
Trenton Shooting Stars 
Yakima Sun Kings

Regular season standings

2000–01 season

Teams
Connecticut Pride
Fort Wayne Fury
Gary Steelheads
Grand Rapids Hoops
Idaho Stampede
La Crosse Bobcats
Quad City Thunder
Rockford Lightning
Sioux Falls Skyforce
Yakima Sun Kings

Regular season standings

2001–02 season

Teams
Dakota Wizards
Fargo-Moorhead Beez
Flint Fuze
Gary Steelheads
Grand Rapids Hoops
Rockford Lightning
Saskatchewan Hawks
Sioux Falls Skyforce

Regular season standings

2002–03 season

Teams
Dakota Wizards
Gary Steelheads
Great Lakes Storm
Grand Rapids Hoops
Idaho Stampede
Rockford Lightning
Sioux Falls Skyforce
Yakima Sun Kings

Regular season standings

2003–04 season

Teams
Dakota Wizards
Gary Steelheads
Great Lakes Storm
Idaho Stampede
Rockford Lightning
Sioux Falls Skyforce
Yakima Sun Kings

Regular season standings

2004–05 season

Teams
Dakota Wizards
Gary Steelheads
Great Lakes Storm
Idaho Stampede
Michigan Mayhem
Rockford Lightning
Sioux Falls Skyforce
Yakima Sun Kings

Regular season standings

2005–06 season

Teams
Albany Patroons
Dakota Wizards
Gary Steelheads
Idaho Stampede
Michigan Mayhem
Rockford Lightning
Sioux Falls Skyforce
Yakima Sun Kings

Regular season standings

2006–07 season

Teams
Albany Patroons
Butte Daredevils
Great Falls Explorers
Indiana Alley Cats
Minot Skyrockets
Pittsburgh Xplosion
Utah Eagles
Vancouver Dragons 
Yakama Sun Kings

Regular season standings

2007–08 season

Teams
Albany Patroons
Atlanta Krunk
Butte Daredevils
East Kentucky Miners
Great Falls Explorers
Minot Skyrockets
Oklahoma Cavalry
Pittsburgh Xplosion
Rio Grande Valley Silverados
Yakama Sun Kings

Regular season standings

2008–09 season

Teams
Albany Patroons
East Kentucky Miners
Lawton-Fort Sill Cavalry
Minot Skyrockets

Regular season standings

CBA franchise timeline
Italics denote a team that was re-located or re-branded; Bold denotes a team that played in the last full CBA season
Albany Patroons (1982–1992) → Capital Region Pontiacs (1992–93) → Hartford Hellcats (1993–94) → Connecticut Pride (1994–2000)
Albany Patroons (2005–09)
Alberta Dusters (1980–82) → Las Vegas Silvers (1982) → Albuquerque Silvers (1982–85)
Allentown Jets (1978–79) → Lehigh Valley Jets (1979–1981)
Anchorage Northern Knights (1978–1983)
Atlanta Krunk (2007–08)
Baltimore Metros (1978–79) → Mohawk Valley Thunderbirds (1979) → Utica Olympics (1979–1980) → Atlantic City Hi-Rollers (1980–83)
Butte Daredevils (2006–08)
Dakota Wizards (2001–06)
Detroit Spirits (1982–86) → Savannah Spirits (1986–88) → Tulsa Fast Breakers (1988–1991) → Tulsa Zone (1991–92) → Fargo-Moorhead Fever (1992–94) → Mexico City Aztecas (1994–95) → San Diego Wildcards (1995)
East Kentucky Miners (2007–09)
Evansville Thunder (1984–86)
Fargo-Moorhead Beez (2001–02)
Flint Fuze (2001–02) → Great Lakes Storm (2002–05)
Fort Wayne Fury (1991–2001)
Gary Steelheads (2000–06)
Grand Rapids Hoops (1989–1994) → Grand Rapids Mackers (1994–96) → Grand Rapids Hoops (1996–2003)
Great Falls Explorers (2006–08)
Hawaii Volcanos (1979–1980) → Billings Volcanos (1980–84)
Idaho Stampede (1997–2006)
Indiana Alley Cats (2006–07)
Jersey Shore Bullets (1978–79)
Kansas City Sizzlers (1985–86) → Topeka Sizzlers (1986–1990) → Yakima Sun Kings (1990–2008)
Lancaster Red Roses (1978–1980) → Philadelphia Kings (1980–81) → Lancaster Lightning (1981–85) → Baltimore Lightning (1985–86) → Rockford Lightning (1986–2006)
Louisville Catbirds (1983–85) → La Crosse Catbirds (1985–1994) → Pittsburgh Piranhas (1994–95)
Maine Lumberjacks (1978–1983) → Bay State Bombardiers (1983–86) → Pensacola Tornados (1986–91) → Birmingham Bandits (1991–92) → Rochester Renegade (1992–94) → Harrisburg Hammerheads (1994–95)
Michigan Mayhem (2004–06)
Minot SkyRockets (2006–2009)
Montana Golden Nuggets (1980–83) → Puerto Rico Coquis (1983–85) → Maine Windjammers (1985–86)
Ohio Mixers (1982–84) → Cincinnati Slammers (1984–87) → Cedar Rapids Silver Bullets (1988–1991) → Tri-City Chinook (1991–95)
Oklahoma Cavalry (2007–08) → Lawton-Fort Sill Cavalry (2008–09)
Oklahoma City Cavalry (1990–97)
Pittsburgh Xplosion (2006–08)
Quad City Thunder (1987–2001)
Reno Bighorns (1982–83)
Rio Grande Valley Silverados (2007–08)
Rochester Zeniths (1978–1984)
Rockford Lightning (2007–09)
San Jose Jammers (1989–1991) → Bakersfield Jammers (1991–92)
Santa Barbara Islanders (1989–1990)
Sarasota Stingers (1983–85) → Florida Stingers (1985–86) → Charleston Gunners (1986–89) → Columbus Horizon (1989–1994) → Shreveport Crawdads (1994–95) → Shreveport Storm (1995–96)
Sioux Falls Sky Force (1989–2000, 2001–06)
Saskatchewan Hawks (2001–02)
Tampa Bay Thrillers (1984–86) → Rapid City Thrillers (1986–1995) → Florida Beachdogs (1995–97)
Toronto Tornados (1983–85) → Pensacola Tornados (1985–86) → Jacksonville Jets (1986) → Mississippi Jets (1986–87) → Wichita Falls Texans (1988–1994) → Chicago Rockers (1994–96) → LaCrosse Bobcats (1996–2001)
Utah Eagles (2006–07)
Wilkes-Barre Barons (1978–79) → Pennsylvania Barons (1979–1980) → Scranton Aces (1980–81)
Wisconsin Flyers (1982–87) → Rochester Flyers (1987–89) → Omaha Racers (1989–1998)
Wyoming Wildcatters (1982–88)

See also
 List of Continental Basketball Association All-Star Games
 List of Continental Basketball Association champions
 List of Continental Basketball Association award winners and successful alumni
 List of developmental and minor sports leagues

References

External links
 CBA history
 CBA seasons on usbasket.com
 Continental Basketball Association Yearly Standings on statscrew.com

Continental Basketball Association